This is a list of windmills in the American state of New York.

Windmills
Known building dates are in bold text. Non-bold text denotes first known date. Iron windpumps are on this list and noted if listed on the National Register of Historic Places.

Locations whose coordinates are included below may be seen together in "Map all coordinates using OpenSourceMap" at right side of this page.

References

Sources

New York
Windmills